NLB may refer to:

Nanotechnology Law & Business, a journal devoted to the legal, business, and policy aspects of nanotechnology
National Labor Board (1933-1934), a former agency of the US government
National League B, former name of the Swiss League, the second highest ice hockey league in Switzerland
National Library Board of Singapore
National Library for the Blind of the United Kingdom
Nationalliga B, former name of the Swiss Challenge League, the second highest football league in Switzerland
Negro league baseball (1885—1960), American baseball leagues with African-American players
Network Load Balancing, a technique for dividing computer network traffic among multiple network connections
New Lantao Bus, a bus service operator on Lantau Island, Hong Kong
New Left Books, former name of Verso Books, the book publishing arm of the New Left Review
NLB League, former name (2006—2011) of the ABA League (Adriatic League), a basketball league of teams from Bosnia and Herzegovina, Croatia, Montenegro, Serbia, and Slovenia
Norbert Leo Butz ((born 1967), American musical theater actor
Northern Lighthouse Board, organisation responsible for marine navigation aids in Scotland and the Isle of Man
Nova Ljubljanska banka, the largest bank in Slovenia